Good Morning Vietnam 2: The Golden Triangle is a 2013 collaborative album by MF Grimm & Drasar Monumental, their second official project together and the sequel to 2012's Good Morning Vietnam EP. Picking up where the previous title left off, this iteration introduces the theme of heroin and the drug trade. Reinforcing this are the American Gangster film samples that can be heard throughout the album.

Reception
Like the first Good Morning Vietnam, Good Morning Vietnam 2: the Golden Triangle was met with positive critical and fan reactions and its initial run sold out very quickly.

Track listing
All tracks produced by Drasar Monumental

References

MF Grimm albums
Concept albums
2013 albums
Sequel albums
Vietnam War in popular culture